Henrik Elvestad (born 3 July 1973) is a Norwegian actor, comedian, and television presenter.

Career

From 2006 to 2015, Elvestad hosted Norwegian television program Golden Goal with Johan Golden, where they invented bubble football.

References

External links

 

1973 births
Living people
Norwegian actors
Norwegian comedians
Norwegian television presenters